Fillér was the name of various small-denomination coins throughout Hungarian history. It was the  subdivision of the Austro-Hungarian and the Hungarian korona, the pengő and the forint. The name derives from the German word  (four). Originally it was the name of the four-kreuzer coin.  Due to significant inflation that took place after the fall of communism, fillér coins are no longer in circulation.  The last fillér coin, worth 50 fillér (0.5 forint) was removed from circulation in 1999.  However, it continues to be used in calculations, for example in the price of petrol (e.g. 479.9 forint/litre), or in the prices of telephone calls.

See also

 Coins of the Austro-Hungarian krone
 Coins of the Hungarian pengő
 Coins of the Hungarian forint

Currencies of Hungary